was a Japanese daimyō of the early Edo period who ruled the Takatō Domain in Shinano Province (modern-day Nagano Prefecture). Tadanori was the son of Torii Tadaharu, the previous lord. He succeeded to family headship upon his father's death; however, he continued his father's draconian rule of the Takatō domain. During the shogunate's investigation into a scandal involving Takatō retainer Takasaka Gonbei, Tadanori was ordered confined to his residence in Edo; he died during his confinement. The Takatō domain was confiscated from the Torii family; however, as the Torii family was a famed fudai family dating back to Torii Mototada, Tadanori's heir Tadateru was granted four districts in Noto Province, and made the lord of the Shimomura Domain.

|-

References
 Japanese Wiki article on Tadanori (15 Sept. 2007)

1646 births
1689 deaths
Daimyo
Torii clan